Paul Barlow is a former Australian rules footballer who played for Richmond in the Victorian Football League (VFL) in 1988. He was recruited from the Scoresby Football Club in the Eastern District Football League (EDFL).

Paul Barlow is the Director of International at carsales.com Ltd.

References

External links

1968 births
Australian rules footballers from Victoria (Australia)
Living people
Port Melbourne Football Club players
Richmond Football Club players
West Adelaide Football Club players